Jonathan Raine (1763–1831) was an English barrister, judge and politician.

Early life
He was the son of Matthew Raine, a cleric and schoolmaster, and younger brother of Matthew Raine FRS. He was educated at Eton College, where he was a friend of Richard Porson, and matriculated in 1783 at Trinity College, Cambridge, graduating B.A. in 1787, and M.A. in 1790; he became a Fellow of Trinity in 1789. Admitted to Lincoln's Inn in 1785, he was called to the bar in 1791.

From 1793 for a decade, Raine was a London criminal lawyer at the Old Bailey. He also became known as a special pleader, went the Northern Circuit, and gained a reputation for Latin verse.

Associations
Raine was one of the circle of William Frend, being present on the occasion of the noted tea party with William Wordsworth on 27 February 1795. In 1800 Matthew and Jonathan Raine were executors for John Warner, the radical Whig cleric and scholar.

Politician, lawyer and judge
At this point John Hammond, a Unitarian academic friend of Frend, hoped that Raine would prove a reformer of the "augean stable".

In 1816 Raine became King's Counsel. In 1818 his seat at Newport, while "owned" by the 3rd Duke of Northumberland, was actually contested by candidates put up by Thomas John Phillipps, who also had property there. In 1823 he was appointed First Justice for the Counties of Anglesey, Carnarvon and Merioneth, a position abolished in 1830. As a Welsh judge, he stood down for Newport in order to contest the seat again: he was re-elected at the by-election, after Rowland Stephenson opposed him. He voted against the Great Reform Bill, which would abolish the Newport constituency.

Family
Raine married Elizabeth Price on 24 June 1799 in Kensington.

Notes

1763 births
1831 deaths
People educated at Eton College
Alumni of Trinity College, Cambridge
Members of the Parliament of the United Kingdom for Launceston
English barristers
19th-century English judges
Fellows of Trinity College, Cambridge
UK MPs 1818–1820
UK MPs 1807–1812
UK MPs 1812–1818
UK MPs 1820–1826
UK MPs 1826–1830
UK MPs 1830–1831
Members of the Parliament of the United Kingdom for Newport (Cornwall)
Members of the Parliament of the United Kingdom for Wareham